Yanaque - Quilcamarca (possibly from Ancash Quechua yanaqi friend, Quechua qillqa writing (the act and art of writing), marka village,) is an archaeological site in Peru.

Yanaque - Quilcamarca are the names of two villages which were situated on the mountain Yanaque and a neighboring mountain, legendary places which share the same history. The ruins contain rectangular, semi-circular and quadrangular structures of stone and tombs.

References 

 Instituto Nacional de Cultura, Centro Nacional de Información Cultural, Contribución para un primer inventario general de sitios arqueológicos del Perú, Lima 2001

Archaeological sites in Ancash Region
Archaeological sites in Peru
Tombs in Peru